Cornelius van Oyen (28 November 1886 – 19 January 1954) was a German sport shooter who competed in the 1936 Summer Olympics. In 1936 he won the gold medal in the 25 metre rapid fire pistol event.

References

External links
 profile

1886 births
1954 deaths
German male sport shooters
ISSF pistol shooters
Olympic shooters of Germany
Shooters at the 1936 Summer Olympics
Olympic gold medalists for Germany
Olympic medalists in shooting
Medalists at the 1936 Summer Olympics
Sportspeople from Brandenburg an der Havel